Ramenye is a rural locality (a village) in Gorodetskoye Rural Settlement, Kichmengsko-Gorodetsky District, Vologda Oblast, Russia. The population was 77 as of 2002. There are 2 streets.

Geography 
Ramenye is located 4 km west of Kichmengsky Gorodok (the district's administrative centre) by road. Ushakovo is the nearest rural locality. ramen` shoulder in slavic languages

References 

Rural localities in Kichmengsko-Gorodetsky District